This Thing Called Wantin' and Havin' It All is the eleventh studio album released by the American country music band Sawyer Brown. Their fourth studio album for Curb Records, it produced four hit singles on the Billboard country music charts between 1995 and 1996: the title track, "'Round Here", "Treat Her Right", and "She's Gettin' There". "She's Gettin' There" was also the band's first single since 1991's "Mama's Little Baby Loves Me" to miss the country Top 40.

Critical reception
Gary Graff and Brian Mansfield, in MusicHound Country: The Essential Album Guide, wrote that the album "continues to hone the band's direction as 'small town heroes'...The first three singles from the album...are probably the strongest trio of hits the group has ever had."

Track listing

Personnel 
Sawyer Brown
 Mark Miller – lead vocals
 Gregg "Hobie" Hubbard – keyboards, backing vocals
 Duncan Cameron – guitars, mandolin, steel guitar, backing vocals
 Jim Scholten – bass
 Joe "Curley" Smyth – drums, percussion

Additional musicians
 John Hobbs – acoustic piano
 James Hooker – keyboards
 Mike Lawler – synthesizers
 Steve Nathan – keyboards
 Matt Rollings – acoustic piano
 Mac McAnally – acoustic guitar, electric guitar
 Dan Dugmore – steel guitar
 Paul Franklin – steel guitar
 JayDee Maness – steel guitar
 Roger Hawkins – drums, percussion
 Terry McMillan – harmonica
 The "A Strings" – strings (3)
 Jim Ed Norman – string arrangements (3)
 Bergen White – string arrangements (3)

Production 
 Mark Miller – producer
 Mac McAnally – producer, additional recording 
 Alan Schulman – recording, mixing
 Ken Hutton – additional recording, recording assistant, mix assistant 
 Steve Lowery – additional recording, recording assistant, mix assistant 
 Kent Bruce – recording assistant, mix assistant 
 Robert Charles – recording assistant
 Michelle Rahmani – recording assistant
 King Williams – recording assistant
 Paula Montondo – mix assistant 
 Don Cobb – digital editing 
 Denny Purcell – mastering
 Hank Williams – mastering 
 Buddy Jackson – art direction, design 
 Peter Nash – photography

Studios
 Recorded at Muscle Shoals Sound Studios (Sheffield, Alabama); La La Land Studio (Louisville, Kentucky); Scruggs Sound Studio, Recording Arts, Javelina Sound Studios and Sound Emporium (Nashville, Tennessee).
 Mixed at Scruggs Sound Studio, Sound Emporium and GroundStar Studios (Nashville, Tennessee); The Castle (Franklin, Tennessee).
 Mastered at Georgetown Masters and MasterMix (Nashville, Tennessee).

Chart performance

References

1995 albums
Sawyer Brown albums
Albums produced by Mac McAnally
Curb Records albums